The Footwork FA14 was a Formula One car with which the Footwork team competed in part of the 1993 Formula One season. It replaced the FA13B, a revised version of the previous year's FA13 chassis that had been used for the first two races of that season. It was driven by veteran Derek Warwick, returning from a 3-year sabbatical, and Aguri Suzuki, retained from 1992.

Race history
At its first race, the attritional European GP at Donington Park, neither driver finished. The FA14's performance proved to be patchy; Suzuki managed a run of seven straight retirements towards the end of the season, while Warwick frequently finished outside the top ten. However, over the course of the season the car's performance steadily improved, with Warwick finishing sixth at his home race at Silverstone, and then fourth at the Hungaroring for his final F1 points. Suzuki's improvement throughout the season was even more marked; after qualifying on the back row at Donington, he qualified sixth at Spa ahead of Warwick and was running fifth until his gearbox retired, and finished seventh at the final race at Adelaide, although he and Warwick did collide at the first corner at Monza.

1993 proved to be both drivers' final full season in F1. Warwick retired at the end of the season, while Suzuki drove briefly for Jordan and Ligier in the following seasons. For the 1994 season they were replaced by Christian Fittipaldi and Gianni Morbidelli.

Race results
(key)

† Driver did not finish the race, but were still classified as they completed 90% of the race distance.

References

 

FA14